Luna 2, originally named the Second Soviet Cosmic Rocket and nicknamed Lunik 2 in contemporaneous media, was the sixth of the Soviet Union's Luna programme spacecraft launched to the Moon, E-1 No.7. It was the first spacecraft to reach the surface of the Moon, and the first human-made object to make contact with another celestial body.

The spacecraft was launched on 12 September 1959 by the Luna 8K72 s/n I1-7B rocket. It followed a direct path to the Moon. In addition to the radio transmitters sending telemetry information back to Earth, the spacecraft released a sodium gas cloud so the spacecraft's movement could be visually observed. On 13 September 1959, it impacted the Moon's surface east of Mare Imbrium near the craters Aristides, Archimedes, and Autolycus.

Prior to impact, two sphere-shaped pennants with USSR and the launch date engraved in Cyrillic were detonated, sending pentagonal shields in all directions. Luna 2 did not detect radiation or magnetic belts around the Moon.

Background 
Luna missions that failed to successfully launch or achieve good results remained unnamed and were not publicly acknowledged. The first unnamed probe exploded on launch on 23 September 1958. Two more launches were unsuccessfully attempted on 11 October 1958 and 4 December 1958. Luna 1 was the fourth launch attempt and the first partial success of the program.

One mission separated Luna 1 and Luna 2, a launch failure that occurred with an unnamed probe on 18 June 1959. Luna 2 would be the Soviet Union's sixth attempt to impact the Moon. Luna 2 was similar in design to Luna 1, a spherical space probe with protruding antennas and instrumentation. The instrumentation was also similar to Luna 1, which included a triaxial fluxgate magnetometer, a piezoelectric detector, a scintillation counter, ion traps and two gas-discharge counters, while the Luna 2 included six gas-discharge counters. There were no propulsion systems on Luna 2 itself.

Payload 

Luna 2 carried five different types of instruments to conduct various tests while it was on its way to the Moon. The scintillation counters were used to measure any ionizing radiation and the Cherenkov radiation detectors to measure electromagnetic radiation caused by charged particles. The primary scientific purpose of the Geiger Counter carried on Luna 2 was to determine the electron spectrum of the Van Allen radiation belt. It consisted of three STS-5 gas-discharge counters mounted on the outside of an airtight container. The last instrument on Luna 2 was a three component fluxgate magnetometer. It was similar to that used on Luna 1 but its dynamic range was reduced by a factor of 4 to ±750 gammas (nT) so that the quantisation uncertainty was ±12 gammas. The probe's instrumentation was powered by silver-zinc and mercury-oxide batteries.

The spacecraft also carried Soviet pennants which were located on the probe and on the Luna 2 rocket. The two sphere-shaped pennants in the probe had surfaces covered by 72 pentagonal elements in a pattern similar to that later used by association footballs. In the centre was an explosive charge designed to shatter the sphere, sending the pentagonal shields in all directions. Each pentagonal element was made of titanium alloy; the centre regular pentagon had the State Emblem of the Soviet Union with the Cyrillic letters СССР ("USSR") engraved below and was surrounded by five non-regular pentagons which were each engraved with СССР СЕНТЯБРЬ 1959 ("USSR SEPTEMBER 1959"). The third pennant was similar engravings on aluminium strips which were embossed on the last stage of the Luna 2 rocket.

The scientists took extra, unspecified precautions in preventing biological contamination of the Moon.

Mission

Launch and trajectory 
A launch was first attempted on 9 September 1959, but the first stage engines failed to reach full thrust, and the launch was aborted while the rocket was on the launch pad. The second attempt occurred on 12 September 1959, and Luna 2 lifted off at 06:39:42 GMT.

Once the vehicle reached Earth's escape velocity, the upper stage was detached, allowing the probe to travel on its path to the Moon. Luna 2 pirouetted slowly, making a full rotation every 14 minutes, while sending radio signals at 183.6, 19.993 and 39.986 MHz. The probe started transmitting information back to Earth using three different transmitters. These transmitters provided precise information on its course, allowing scientists to calculate that Luna 2 would hit its mark on the Moon around 00:05 on 14 September (Moscow Time), which was announced on Radio Moscow.

Because of claims that information received from Luna 1 was fake, the Russian scientists sent a telex to astronomer Bernard Lovell at Jodrell Bank Observatory at the University of Manchester. Having received the intended time of impact, and the transmission and trajectory details, it was Bernard Lovell who confirmed the mission's success to outside observers. However, the American media were still skeptical of the data until Lovell was able to prove that the radio signal was coming from Luna 2 by showing the Doppler shift from its transmissions.

Lunar impact 

It hit the Moon about 0° West and 29.1° North of the centre of the visible disk at 00:02:24 (Moscow Time) on 14 September 1959. The probe became the first human-made object to hit another celestial body. To be able to provide a visual from Earth on 13 September, the Luna 2 released a vapour cloud that expanded to a  diameter and was seen by observatories in Alma Ata, Byurakan, Abastumani, Tbilisi, and Stalinabad. This vapour cloud also acted as an experiment to see how the sodium gas would act in a vacuum and zero gravity. The last stage of the rocket that carried Luna 2 also hit the Moon's surface about 30 minutes after Luna 2, but there was uncertainty as to where it landed.

Bernard Lovell began tracking the probe about five hours before it impacted the Moon and also recorded the transmission from the probe, which ends abruptly. He played the recording during a phone call to reporters in New York to finally convince most media observers of the mission's authenticity.

Results 
Although it did prove previous measurements of the Van Allen radiation belts that were taken from Luna 1 around the Earth, it was not able to detect any type of radiation belts around the Moon at or beyond the limits of its magnetometer's sensitivity (2–3x10−4 G).

Luna 2 showed time variations in the electron flux and energy spectrum in the Van Allen radiation belt. Using ion traps on board, the satellite made the first direct measurement of solar wind flux from outside the Earth's magnetosphere. On its approach to the lunar surface, the probe did not detect any notable magnetic field to within  from the Moon.

Cultural significance 
According to Donald William Cox, Americans were starting to believe that they were making progress in the Space Race and that although the Soviet Union might have had larger rockets, the United States had better guidance systems, but these beliefs were questioned when the Soviets were able to impact Luna 2 on the Moon. Soviet Premier Nikita Khrushchev, on his only visit to the United States, gave President Dwight D. Eisenhower a replica of the Soviet pennants that Luna 2 had just placed onto the lunar surface. Luna 2 and its predecessors all came to be used throughout the USSR and around the world as pro-communist propaganda. Donald W. Cox wrote in his 1962 book The Space Race: Although the Sputniks and Luniks did not themselves provide better cars, refrigerators, color TV sets, and homes for the peasants and laborers of the Soviet Union and her satellite states, they did evoke added inspiration for the earthbound followers of the communist way of life helping to take their minds off shortages of consumer goods. The people were spurred on to work just a little harder for the glorious motherland and to outstrip the west in the less dramatic and more basic things of life, like coal and steel production.

Legacy 
Luna 2 was a success for the Soviets, and was the first in a series of missions (lunar impactors) that were intentionally crashed on the Moon. The later U.S.-made Ranger missions ended in similar impacts. Such controlled crashes have remained useful even after the technique of soft landing was mastered. NASA used hard spacecraft impacts to test whether shadowed Moon craters contain ice by analyzing the debris that got thrown out.

The pennant presented to Eisenhower is kept at the Eisenhower Presidential Library and Museum in Abilene, Kansas, U.S. A copy of the spherical pennant is located at the Kansas Cosmosphere in Hutchinson, Kansas.

On 1 November 1959, the Soviet Union released two stamps commemorating the spacecraft. They depict the trajectory of the mission.

See also 

 Soviet space program
 Sinus Lunicus
 List of artificial objects on the Moon

References

Notes

Citations

Sources

External links 

Luna programme
Spacecraft launched in 1959
1959 in the Soviet Union
Spacecraft that impacted the Moon
Impactor spacecraft
1959 on the Moon